Regina Ongsiako Reyes-Mandanas (July 3, 1964 – May 5, 2022) was a member of the Philippine House of Representatives representing the lone legislative district of Marinduque. She was the youngest daughter of former Bureau of Immigration Commissioner Edmundo Reyes, Sr. and Marinduque Governor Carmencita O. Reyes. She was also the wife of incumbent Batangas Governor Hermilando Mandanas.

Early life and career
Regina Ongsiako Reyes was twice accelerated in her primary and secondary school. A consistent Dean's Lister, she finished her Foreign Service degree at Georgetown University. She then studied at the Ateneo Law School, where she graduated in the honor roll. After passing the Philippine Bar Examination, she served in government and worked as a solicitor at the Office of Solicitor General. She was the youngest solicitor in history, and also took advanced studies in Comparative Law.
 
She decided to pursue her profession further by becoming a member of the State Bar of California and the Federal Communications Bar Association.

Advocacies
She was a devoted member of the Special Projects Group of Gawad Kalinga and was engaged in supporting rehabilitation centers for abused and neglected children, disaster management and relief operations, and volunteer recruitment. Reyes also joined Answering the Cry of the Poor Foundation (USA) Inc., better known as ANCOP U.S.A., and helped empower poor Filipino families by providing them shelter and livelihood programs, and promoting a culture of health consciousness.

Political career
She was the provincial administrator of Marinduque for almost two years. During her term, she has been very active in program implementation of the Provincial Government of Marinduque particularly programs by the Provincial Social Welfare Development Office (PSWDO) on gender, women, children and senior citizens and the Provincial Nutrition Office (PNO) on barangay nutrition scholars and supplemental feedings for malnourished children. She was also active in fighting against irresponsible mining and provided jobs to the affected community.

In May 2013, Reyes gained almost 4,000 votes more than her opponent. She was proclaimed as the winner by the Marinduque COMELEC Provincial Board of Canvassers and subsequently took her oath of office before President Benigno S. Aquino III and House Speaker Feliciano Belmonte in Malacañang as the duly elected representative of the Lone District of Marinduque. 

As a member of the 16th Congress, she was the vice-chairwoman of the House Committee on National Defense and Security. She was also a member of several committees, which include the committees on Appropriations, Justice, Health, Natural Resources, Veterans Affairs and Welfare, Suffrage and Electoral Reforms, Youth and Sports Development, Higher and Technical Education, Overseas Workers Affairs, Public Order and Safety, and Women and Gender Equality.

Death 
Reyes-Mandanas died on 5 May 2022 at Makati Medical Center due to sepsis. She was admitted to the hospital because of a bacterial infection affecting her right foot.

References

External links
 yesmarinduque.com

1964 births
2022 deaths
Ateneo de Manila University alumni
People from Marinduque
Members of the House of Representatives of the Philippines from Marinduque
Walsh School of Foreign Service alumni
Filipino Roman Catholics
Deaths from sepsis
21st-century Filipino politicians
21st-century Filipino women politicians